The Obscure Cities, first published in English as, variously, Stories of the Fantastic and Cities of the Fantastic, is a bande dessinée series created by Belgian artist François Schuiten and French writer Benoît Peeters. First serialized in magazine format in 1982, the series has been published in album format by Brussels-based publisher Casterman since 1983. New installments of the series were published throughout the 1980s, 1990s, and 2000s, in varying formats, including full-color, partial color, greyscale, and black-and-white comic illustration, as well as photo comic, picture book, and multimedia formats. The series is distinguished by Schuiten's realistic rendering of diverse contemporary, historical, and imaginary architectural styles.

In this fictional world, humans live in independent city-states, each of which has developed a distinct civilization, each characterized by a distinctive architectural style. The series has no unifying narrative, instead telling a series of unrelated stories, using its fictional setting as the basis for magic realism and social commentary.

Background 

Schuiten's graphic representations and architectural styles within Les Cités obscures is, among other historical themes, heavily influenced by Belgian Art Nouveau architect Victor Horta, who worked in Brussels at the turn of the 20th century. An important motif is the process of what he calls Bruxellisation, the destruction of this historic Brussels in favor of anonymous, low-quality modernist office and business buildings. Coming from a family of architects, Schuiten had many relatives, especially his father and brothers, who were instrumental in Bruxellisation, an important part in Schuiten's and Peeters' 1950s childhood memories of the city. Schuiten was brought up to study architecture by his father, both in university and early on at home, while young Schuiten preferred to pursue his escape to the world of Franco-Belgian bandes dessinées such as those he found in Pilote magazine that his older brother introduced him to, with René Goscinny, Morris, and André Franquin among his early favorites.

Around 1980, having become an emerging established graphic novel artist who had made himself a name publishing in Métal Hurlant and creating a number of standalone albums, Schuiten began drafting a parallel world of vintage architectural splendor reflecting his childhood memories of Brussels, a world which can be reached primarily through remaining buildings of these times gone by. In an ongoing attempt to prevent the spread of knowledge of this parallel world, mostly faceless authorities in our world increasingly have these buildings torn down, and in Schuiten's world this was the true reason for chaotic, headless Bruxellisation where functional and organic buildings were destroyed in favor of ill-planned, useless, and confusing structures such as ill-planned roads, detours, freeways, and anonymous office buildings that destroyed the organic fabric of a city and resulted in dysfunctional traffic and living routines.

Approaching his friend Peeters, who by now had become a comic writer, about this imaginary world, Peeters infused his own philosophical ideas into plot lines he developed for the project, and in 1982 the first Les Cités obscures album, Les murailles de Samaris, began publication as a serial in the Franco-Belgian comics magazine À Suivre. Requiring a few revised editions of the early albums, the basic tenets and elements of Le monde obscure were laid down since the late 1980s.

Influences 

Various commentators, as well as Schuiten himself, have identified visual and theme influences in Les Cités obscures from as diverse works as those by Jules Verne, Winsor McCay, Franz Kafka, René Magritte, Giovanni Battista Piranesi, Victor Horta, Henry Fuseli, and Jean-Léon Gérôme.

Books in the Cités obscures series
The stories of the cités obscures appear in a series of graphic novels and related books, published by Casterman. Most, but not all, albums have been published in English, some multiple times: first in serialized form in Heavy Metal and Dark Horse Comics' Cheval Noir, then as complete albums by NBM Publishing and IDW Publishing. The books published in French so far below:

Official series 

 Les murailles de Samaris (1983, published 1987 in English as The Great Walls of Samaris (Stories of the Fantastic), paperback)
 La fièvre d'Urbicande (1985, published 1990 in English as Fever in Urbicand (Cities of the Fantastic), translated by Jean-Marc Lofficier & Randy Lofficier, paperback)
 La Tour (1987, published 1993 in English as The Tower (Stories of the Fantastic) translated by Jean-Marc Lofficier & Randy Lofficier, paperback)
 La route d'Armilia (1988, available in English as "The Road to Armilia" (unofficial edition))
 Brüsel (1992, published 2001 in English as Brüsel (Cities of the Fantastic), hardcover)
 L'enfant penchée (1996, published 2014 in English as The Leaning Girl)
 L'ombre d'un homme (1999)
 La frontière invisible, Volume 1 (2002, published in English as The Invisible Frontier (Cities of the Fantastic), hardcover)
 La frontière invisible, Volume 2 (2004, published in English as The Invisible Frontier (Cities of the Fantastic), hardcover)
 La Théorie du grain de sable, Volume 1 (2007)
 La Théorie du grain de sable, Volume 2 (2008)

Spin-offs 

Beside these "official" parts to the story, Schuiten and Peeters also collaborated, partly with other authors, on a number of works that were not originally linked to the series but that were set in similar settings, were linked to it later, and/or highlighted particular aspects of the Obscure World without being a traditional narrative.

 Le Mystère d'Urbicande (1985)
 L'archiviste (1987)
 L'Encyclopédie des transports présents et à venir’‘(1988);Casterman 1988 
 Le passage (1989)
 Le Musée A. Desombres (1990: booklet and audio CD)
 L'Écho des cités (1993)
 Souvenirs de l'Eternel présent (1993), an adaptation of the film Taxandria (see below)
 Mary la penchée (1995)
 Le Guide des cités (1996), an illustrated tourist guide to the Obscure Cities L'etrange cas du docteur Abraham (2001)
 L'affaire Desombres (2002: booklet and 90-minute DVD)

The volume Voyages en Utopie (2000) presents the ongoing and completed work carried on by these two authors, in parallel with the Cités obscures series. Another book Schuiten and Peeters collaborated on in reference to Les Cités obscures is Les Portes du Possible (2005).

Worldbuilding 

The world (or "continent", according to the authors) of the Cités obscures forms a disparate grouping of cities located on a "counter-Earth", which is invisible from our Earth because it is situated exactly opposite it on the other side of the Sun. A map illustrated on the final page of Les Murailles de Samaris first hinted at the extent of this alternate world, and a full world map shown in the opening pages of La Fièvre d'Urbicande labeled many more city names. Next, L'Archiviste, an oversized poster book, illustrated many of these cities in a series of decontextualized images. Some of the images from L'Archiviste were revisited in later albums or stories, while others remain unexplored. In 1996, Le Guide des Cités was published, presented as a guide book which catalogued the cities of this world as tourist destinations.

Although these books are similar to spinoff media used in transmedia storytelling in media franchises, Les Cités obscures departs from such conventions by keeping its fictional universe "open" and "ad hoc" in nature. There are no central characters or locations, there is no overarching narrative, and there are few or no connections between stories of individual albums. Commentary on the series has also emphasized the absence of a bible for the setting.

The openness of the Cités obscures setting has allowed readers to participate in worldbuilding, especially after the authors introduced the notion that travel between the two worlds is possible by means of "gates" (portes) called Obscure Passages. These are mostly to be found in buildings and constructions similar or identical to each other on both planets, whereas the distinct architectural style of a structure makes it a potential candidate to harbor an Obscure Passage to an Obscure City whose distinct style it resembles.

Both the authors and fans have created false documents in the Cités obscures setting. As early as 1990, Schuiten and Peeters enclosed "authentic" documentary or amateur CDs (Le Musée A. Desombres, 1990), and later, DVDs (L'affaire Desombres, 2002) to their print publications regarding the Obscure Cities. Likewise, on websites such as Web of the Obscure Cities (which is no longer online but is documented on AltaPlana.be, an online encyclopaedia for Obscure Cities) and Office of the Obscure Passages, Schuiten and Peeters present alleged reports, often illustrated with photos and drawings, claiming accidental crossings over into the world of the Obscure Cities via Obscure Passages, or by so-called Obscurantists who have been seeking Obscure Passages for years (compare Obscurantist, a term based upon the Epistolæ Obscurorum Virorum, aka "Letters of Obscure Men"). The real authorship of some of this material remains unclear due to the use of pseudepigrapha.

Some of this worldbuilding material is incorporated into the Cités obscures publications. The authors claim that, after creating the character Mary von Rathen in Le Musée A. Desombres, they received correspondence from an unknown person identifying as the character, first by mail and later e-mail, which invented new details of the Cités obscures setting from a first-person perspective. In Le Guide des Cités, Schuiten and Peeters directly incorporate assertions and quotes from this correspondence, even where the claims contradict published material. Though the source of the letters remains unknown, Schuiten and Peeters deny authorship.

 Taxandria 
  
Benoît Peeters had collaborated with director Raoul Servais before on a documentary entitled Servaisgraphia on Servais's unique animation style that was released in 1992. Subsequently, there is a loose connection between the increasingly multimedia series of the Obscure Cities and the Belgian fantasy film Taxandria (1994) directed by Servais (starring, among others, Armin Mueller-Stahl), where Schuiten served as production designer. In the Obscure Cities series, at times characters refer to the vanished city-state of Taxandria which was accidentally removed from the planet during a failed scientific experiment.

A common theme in steampunk-influenced Les Cités obscures, Taxandrian clothing and technology appear to resemble Victorian times on our earth, Taxandria's architecture is reminiscent of Schuiten's trademark phantasmagorical architectural fantasies, and another feature the film shares with Les Cités obscures is a bloated absurd, Kafkaesque bureaucracy. It is however under dispute among fans of the series whether Taxandria is truly one of the Obscure Cities due to a perceived appearance of a light-hearted children's fantasy movie to Servais's film.

A reinterpreting graphic novel adaptation of the movie Taxandria was published by Schuiten and Peeters one year prior to the film's official release under the title Souvenirs de l'Eternel Présent: Variation sur le Film Taxandria de Raoul Servais (Arboris, 1993), also including production background information on the film.

 Multimedia 

Schuiten and Peeters increasingly seek to transcend their world of the Obscure Cities from graphic novels into other media to create an entire universe, even though their comic albums remain the core foundation of Schuiten and Peeters's emerging multimedia franchise.

 Books, CDs, films 

This trend for multimedia expansion began with the book Le Mystère d'Urbicande (1985) which marked the series' acquiring a life of its own and whereby Schuiten and Peeters began to realize the true potential of their concept. Written by Belgian author and Obscure fan Thierry Smolderen (under the pseudonym Professeur R. de Brok), Le Mystère d'Urbicande purports to be a scientific essay bent to debunk the events of La fièvre d'Urbicande, heavily annotated in emotional handwriting by Eugen Robick, the main character of La fièvre d'Urbicande who is now locked up in Brüsel's Sixth Hospice, the city's mental asylum. Schuiten contributed the book's illustrations under the pen-name Robert Louis Marie de la Barque (whereas the French word barque, meaning barge or rowboat in English, translates to schuiten in Dutch).

Drafting and developing stages of the above-mentioned film Taxandria and its accompanying graphic novel adaptation began between Schuiten and Peeters as early as 1988.

In 1990, the development was further explored with Le Musée A. Desombres, an audio CD with a small booklet drawn by Schuiten, purporting to be an exhibition catalogue of paintings by Auguste Desombres, an artist living in our world in the late 19th century. The CD contains an audio play that is partly a fake report from Desombres's first exhibition, partly chronicles Desombres crossing over into the world of the Obscure Cities by accident by means of his own exhibition.

In 2002, Schuiten and Peeters published the DVD L'affaire Desombres, a sequel to Le Musée A. Desombres.

A setting of La fièvre d'Urbicande, cult album in the Obscure Cities series, appears in the 2012 Canadian science fiction movie Mars et Avril by Martin Villeneuve, based on the graphic novels of the same name. As a matter of fact, François Schuiten agreed to have a 3D model made out of his futuristic auditorium, for a scene taking place inside the Temple of Cosmologists. The director had this image in mind when writing his books, a few years before Schuiten joined the team as production designer. Before the shooting, even the extras were chosen to look like the characters in the comic book.

 Urbicande.be 

In 1996, Urbicande.be, the official website of the Obscure Cities went online where Schuiten and Peeters encouraged their fans all over Europe to send in their own ideas regarding the Obscure Cities and accounts of their own experiences in search for Obscure Passages. The response was so overwhelming that Schuiten and Peeters were able to expand their online activities into a complex network of in-universe sites, mainly branching from the URL ebbs.net of their official Obscure magazine called Obskür, where many amateur reports, illustrated by photos and Schuiten's drawings, and various mysterious Obscure artifacts can be found. Along with these, a number of conspiracy theories are explored, regarding authorities of our world intending to prevent the spread of knowledge regarding the parallel world and destroy various Obscure Passages. In May 2015, Urbicande.be was taken offline and archived at AltaPlana.be, an official online encyclopaedia of the Obscure Cities universe.

 La maison Autrique 

After having colorfully satirized the destructive modernizing fad of Bruxellisation in the Les Cités obscures album Brüsel in 1992, Schuiten and Peeters convinced the community of Schuiten's childhood district Schaerbeek to acquire one of the last remaining buildings in Brussels built by Art Nouveau architect Horta, La maison Autrique, and in 1999 opened a permanent pseudo-documentary exhibition inside, regarding the Obscure Cities, 19th century Art Nouveau Brussels, and detailing its ongoing Bruxellisation destruction during the 20th century, tying in with aforementioned conspiracy theories whereby Bruxellisation is supposed to be an attempt by the authorities to destroy a number of Obscure Passages situated in Brussels.

In 2004, Schuiten and Peeters published the illustrated book La Maison Autrique: Métamorphose d'une maison Art Nouveau (published as Maison Autrique – Metamorphosis of an Art Nouveau House in English) about the building, its restoration during the 1990s, and Horta's life and work. Also, their latest Les Cités obscures two-part graphic novel album La Théorie du grain de sable (2007; 2008) deals with the maison Autrique. As of 2021, the house also hosts a Cités obscures-themed escape room game.

 Publishing history 
The full series is available in French and Dutch from Casterman; in German, Spanish, Polish (Manzoku and Scream Comics) and Portuguese by local publishing houses; in francophone Canada by Flammarion; and in Japanese in four collected volumes by Shogakukan-Shueisha Productions.

The first five books of the series were published in English by NBM Publishing; these went out of print in 2008. Alaxis Press (named after the "sulphuric" Obscure City of Alaxis) issued an English-language edition of The Leaning Girl (L'enfant penchée) in 2014. Leaning Mary, a spin-off picture book, was issued in 2015.Schuiten & Peeters (2013). Official announcement of the English-language publishing project of Alaxis Press by Schuiten & Peeters on their official Facebook profile Alta-Plana, archives of the Obscure Cities, January 27, 2013

In 2016, Alaxis partnered with IDW Publishing as the new North American publisher of The Obscure Cities, with Alaxis Press co-branding, and the original staff handling translation and editing. IDW and Alaxis published The Theory of the Grain of Sand in 2016, Samaris in 2017, The Shadow of a Man in 2021, and The Tower in 2022. IDW then released The Fever in Urbicande and will release The Invisible Frontier in 2022, without Alaxis's involvement; however, the entire Obscure Cities series has been delisted from IDW's website prior to release of these books, and it is not known whether the publisher is committed to completing the series.The Leaning Girl received a 2015 Eisner Award nomination as Best U.S. Edition of International Material, and The Shadow of a Man won the same award in 2022.

Awards
1985: Angoulême International Comics Festival Prize for Best Album – La Fièvre d'Urbicande2012: Gaiman Award for Best Comic
2022: Eisner Award for Best U.S. Edition of International Material – The Shadow of a ManNotes

References

 Les Cités obscures at Bedetheque 

 Altaplana.be, the official website about Les Cités obscures

 Further reading 

Various (Schuiten & Peeters among others; 1994). Schuiten & Peeters: Autour des Cités obscures, Mosquito Dossier FRANCOIS SCHUITEN, in Reddition, #32, 1998 , Table of Contents & order
Schuiten; Peeters (2000). Voyages en Utopie, Casterman 
Benoît Peeters (2004). The Book of Schuiten, MSW Medien Service Wuppertal 
2nd edition (2004), NBM Publishing
3rd edition (2004), Casterman
Schuiten; Peeters (2004). Maison Autrique – Metamorphosis of an Art Nouveau House, Ed. Les Impressions Nouvelles
Schuiten; Peeters (2005). Les Portes du Possible, Casterman 

 External links 
 Official sites 

Caution: All official sites by Schuiten & Peeters below treat the Obscure Cities from a strictly in-universe perspective (for example, all of their works related to the series are called "accounts" or "chronicles" rather than fiction stories).
Urbicande , official web site of the Cités obscures. This site is no longer online but is archived at Alta-Plana, The impossible and infinite encyclopedia of the world created by Schuiten & Peeters (English)
Alta-Plana, archives of the Obscure Cities, Schuiten's & Peeters's official Facebook profile for the series (French & English)
Alta-Plana, the City of Archives, editable in-universe Wiki-style encyclopedia on Le monde obscure  (English)
Obskür, the magazine about the Obscure Cities. This site is no longer online. (French & English)
Web of the Obscure Cities This site is no longer online but is archived at Alta-Plana, The impossible and infinite encyclopedia of the world created by Schuiten & Peeters (French, English, Dutch)
Office of the Obscure Passages (French & English)
Dictionary of the Universe of the Obscure Cities (French & English)
Luminas, Daily Newspaper of the Obscure Cities (French & English)
The Light  (no longer updated)
Tram 81 Graphic-intensive site about one of the Obscure Passages. Site is no longer online. (French, English, Dutch)
Cités obscures. A graphic exploratory voyage of the world 

Official website for the English-language market:
The Obscure Cities.com, official website of English-language publisher Alaxis Press and their Kickstarter campaign to bring the complete licensed series to the English-speaking world (differs from the above websites because not styled in in-universe perspective, i. e. mostly written from a real-world perspective)

 Secondary sources 
 The Obscure Cities by Francois Schuiten & Benoit Peeters: A comprehensive review of the Obscure Cities series for English-speaking fans, Text: Sylvain St.-Pierre, Design: Jim Harrison, IKON Press
 Cities of the Fantastic: A Contemporary Series of Verne-inspired Graphic Novels, review of the series by Duane Spurlock, on Pulprack.com
 Darius, Julian (s. 2011). The Obscure Cites: An Introduction, serialized, on-going analysis of entire series, in Sequart Magazine The World Of The Obscure Cities: A Parallel World Of Architectural Splendour, by Roel van der Meulen, on Project Galactic Guide
 Les Cités obscures, series review, also including a partial list of different editions (in French and other languages), by Julian Darius on The Continuity Pages (Wayback Machine snapshot dating October 23, 2006, as today, this URL re-directs to Darius's more recent in-depth analysis of each volume in Sequart Magazine'', see link above, that lacks these information on editions)
 Latour in Urbicande

Counter-Earths
Art Nouveau works
Belgian comic strips
Belgian graphic novels
Drama comics
Fantasy comics
1983 comics debuts